The coat of arms of the Republic of the Congo has a shield with a rampant red lion holding a torch. The background color of the shield is gold with a green, wavy, horizontal stripe along the middle. A golden crown sits above the shield. Two large African war elephants support the shield. A banner with the national motto "Unité Travail Progrès" ("Unity, Work, Progress" translated from "La Congolaise") is draped from a bar supporting the war elephants. The arms were adopted in 1960 and readopted in 1991 after having been replaced with a simpler, unheraldic symbol during the People's Republic of the Congo era from 1970–1991.

Official description
The coat of arms is described as follows:

Or, a fess wavy vert, a lion gules, armed and langued vert, overall, maintaining a torch sable flamed gules.
A special forest crown.
The shield is supported by two war elephants sable tusked or, issuing from the flanks of the shield and sustained on a tree trunk gules.
On the circle or of the forest crown: "République du Congo" in letters gules upon a scroll or.
Motto "Unité-Travail-Progrès" in letters gules upon a scroll or.

Historical symbols

References

National symbols of the Republic of the Congo
Congo, Republic of the
Congo, Republic
Congo, Republic
Congo, Republic
Congo, Republic